Lal Ganj (also Romanized as La‘l Ganj) is a village in Lahrud Rural District, Meshgin-e Sharqi District, Meshgin Shahr County, Ardabil Province, Iran. At the 2006 census, its population was 164, in 35 families.

References 

Tageo

Towns and villages in Meshgin Shahr County